Hispania is a town and municipality in Antioquia Department, Colombia. Part of the subregion of Southwestern Antioquia.

Municipalities of Antioquia Department